During sectarian violence in Pakistan, the Major Kaleem Case was the bedrock of many Pakistani governmental and military operations against the Muttahida Qaumi Movement (MQM), namely Operation Clean-up and is often termed as the last straw which broke the camel's back.

Several MQM leaders and workers were alleged to have been involved in the kidnapping and torture of Pakistan Army Major Kaleem in 1991.

On February 6, 1998 the Sindh High Court found all defendants innocent and found the case as one "of almost no legal evidence". However, on February 20, 1998, Major Kaleem appealed the decision to the Supreme Court and contended that "the High Court erred by acquitting the accused who did not surrender themselves before the trial court. He argued that there was sufficient evidence against the respondents to prove their guilt."

On Monday, August 13, 2007, the Sindh government mysteriously withdrew its appeal in the aftermath of restoration of independent minded chief justice, and all charges against the accused were dismissed.

References

 MQM shifts blame for 1992 operation from military to Nawaz, The News (Pakistan), 2 September 2009

History of Pakistan
History of Sindh (1947–present)
1998 in case law
1998 in Pakistan
Pakistani commissions and inquiries
Torture in Pakistan